Araneus circe is an orb-weaving spider species with a Palearctic distribution.

See also
List of Araneidae species: A

References

External links

circe
Spiders of Europe
Spiders described in 1826
Palearctic spiders